Eueana is a genus of moths in the family Geometridae first described by Prout in 1912.

Species
 Eueana niveociliaria (Herrich-Schäffer, 1870)
 Eueana simplaria Herbulot, 1986

References

Geometrinae